Jay Wayne Baker (born April 12, 1961) is an American actor, producer, and television host.

Biography 

Jay was born in Sweetwater, Tennessee, and is an alumnus of Tennessee Military Institute, where he was in the drama program. Jay's professional career began in 1978 as a musical stage performer. He was based in Los Angeles until 2001, appearing in movies and television. In 2001, he moved back to his native Tennessee and began focusing his talents on production and hosting of DIY-themed television programs.

Filmography

Film

Television

Producer

References

External links
 

Living people
20th-century American male actors
American male film actors
1961 births
People from Sweetwater, Tennessee